Villa San Pietro, Santu Perdu in Sardinian language, is a comune (municipality) in the Metropolitan City of Cagliari in the Italian region Sardinia, located about  southwest of Cagliari.

Villa San Pietro borders the following municipalities: Assemini, Pula, Santadi, Sarroch.

References

Cities and towns in Sardinia